Cornago is a village in the province and autonomous community of La Rioja, Spain.

Demographics

Population centres
 Cornago
 Valdeperillo

Main sights

Religious buildings
 Church of Saint Peter
 Monastery of Our Lady of Campolapuente
 Hermitage of Saint Catherine
 Hermitage of Saint Anne
 Hermitage of Saint Blaise, former synagogue
 Hermitage of Saint Roch
 Hermitage of Saint Sebastian
 Hermitage of Saint Martin

Civil buildings
 Castle of Cornago
 Palace of the Baroja family

References

External links 

 Tourism website of Cornago

Populated places in La Rioja (Spain)